Natalia Nikolayevna Strelkova (born in 1961) is a former competitive figure skater for the Soviet Union. She is the 1981 Winter Universiade champion, the 1977 Blue Swords and Prize of Moscow News champion, and a three-time Soviet national silver medalist. Her coaches included Tatiana Lovenko, Alexei Mishin, and Igor Moskvin.

Competitive highlights

References 

Soviet female single skaters
Universiade medalists in figure skating
Living people
1961 births
Universiade gold medalists for the Soviet Union
Competitors at the 1981 Winter Universiade